

Events

January events
 January 1 – The Soo Line Railroad fully absorbs the Milwaukee Road after attempting to operate it as a subsidiary railroad.
 January 3 – Vancouver's SkyTrain begins operations between the waterfront and New Westminster.

February events
 February 8 – 23 people are killed in the Hinton train collision when a Via Rail passenger train collides with a Canadian National Railway freight train near Hinton, Alberta.
 February 17 – Class 59 Co-Co diesel locomotives built by EMD for Foster Yeoman introduced into heavy freight service on British Rail, the first US-built (and privately owned) diesel locomotives to operate regularly on the English network.

March events
 March 3 – Shin-Narashino Station, on what is now JR East's Keiyō Line in Narashino, Chiba, Japan, is opened.
 March 24 – Edinburgh–Bathgate line in Scotland reopened to rail passengers.
 March 25 – Conrail makes its initial public offering of stock starting at US$28 per share.

April events
 April 1 – The Prince and Princess of Wales (Charles and Diana) open Heathrow Terminal 4 tube station on London Underground's Piccadilly line. Trains do not start serving the station until April 12, when the corresponding terminal starts handling flights.

June events
 June 1 – The Amsterdam–Schiphol railway is opened by Nederlandse Spoorwegen.
 June 2 – Very Fast Train Joint Venture first meets in Australia.

July events
 July 24 – The United States Interstate Commerce Commission denies the merger of the Santa Fe and Southern Pacific Railroad, citing an excessive amount of parallel track as one reason for the denial.
 July 26 – The Lockington rail crash at Lockington, Humberside, England occurs when a van is struck on a level crossing. Eight passengers on the train, and a boy of 11 in the van, lose their lives.

September events
 September 5 – The Dakota, Minnesota and Eastern Railroad begins operations in Minnesota and South Dakota.
 September 5 – Portland, Oregon's light rail system, MAX, opens for service.
 September 8 – The Crab Orchard & Egyptian Railroad becomes the last common carrier freight railroad in America to cease using steam locomotives as primary power when the dry-pipe in their CLC 2-8-0 No. 17 steamer collapses.
 September 19 – Two high speed trains collide near Rugeley, Staffordshire, England, in the Colwich rail crash; the driver of one of the two trains was the only fatality of this accident.

October events
 October 31 – Closure of the "Corkickle Brake" serving a chemical works at Whitehaven, Cumbria, the last commercially operated standard gauge cable railway in the United Kingdom.

November events
 November 11 – Preserved steam locomotive British Railways Standard class 8 71000 Duke of Gloucester is officially recommissioned to service on the Great Central Railway following a 13-year restoration from part-dismantled condition.
 November 15 – Australia's well known steam locomotive 3801 is recommissioned at the Hunter Valley Training Company in New South Wales.
 November 21 – The Florida Central Railroad begins operations in Florida, United States.
 November 27 – Oslo Central Station in Oslo, Norway is taken into use.

December events
 December 30 – The Trans-Gabon Railway is completed.

Accidents

Deaths

July deaths
 July 14 – Raymond Loewy, industrial designer who worked for the Pennsylvania Railroad designing the shape of equipment such as the GG1 (born 1893).

References 
 
 Rivanna Chapter, National Railway Historical Society (2005), This Month in Railroad History: July.  Retrieved July 22, 2005.